Lokomotiv often refers to:

Lokomotiv (sports society), formerly Soviet Union, now Commonwealth of Independent States

Lokomotiv may also refer to:

Association football 
FC Lokomotiv Chita, Russia
FC Lokomotiv Liski, Russia
FC Lokomotiv Moscow, Russia
FC Lokomotiv Nizhny Novgorod, Russia
FC Lokomotiv Saint Petersburg, Russia
Lokomotiv Cove FC, Australia aka The Trains
Lokomotiv-Bilajary FK, Azerbaijan
PFC Lokomotiv Plovdiv, Bulgaria
FC Lokomotiv Gorna Oryahovitsa, Bulgaria
FC Lokomotiv 1929 Sofia, Bulgaria
FC Lokomotiv Ruse, Bulgaria
FC Lokomotiv Dryanovo, Bulgaria
FC Lokomotiv Mezdra, Bulgaria
NK Lokomotiva, Croatia
FC Locomotive Tbilisi, Georgia
FC Lokomotíva Košice, Slovakia
1. FC Lokomotive Leipzig, Germany
Locomotiva Bălți, Moldova
Lokomotiv Tashkent FK, Uzbekistan
FC Lokomotyv Kyiv, Ukraine
FK Lokomotiva Skopje, Macedonia
El Paso Locomotive FC, United States

Other sports 
HC Lokomotiv Yaroslavl, a Russian hockey team
VC Lokomotiv Novosibirsk, a Russian volleyball team
RC Lokomotiv Moscow, a Russian rugby league team
PBC Lokomotiv Kuban, a Russian basketball team
Lokomotiv Orenburg, a Russian bandy team
RK Lokomotiva Zagreb, a Croatian handball team
MFC Lokomotyv Kharkiv, a Ukrainian futsal team
BSC Lokomotiv Moscow, a Russian beach soccer team
Lokomotiv Baku, an Azerbaijani women's volleyball club
Lokomotiv Balajary, an Azerbaijani women's volleyball club

Other uses
Lokomotiv (band), a Southern California band
Lokomotiv (Moscow Central Circle), a rail station on the Moscow Metro

See also
Lokomotief Rijswijk, a Dutch basketball club
Lokomotiv Stadium (disambiguation)
Locomotive (disambiguation)
Lokomotive, a German mountain